Berend Koekemoer (born 12 June 1995) is a male South African sprinter specialising in the 400 metres. He competed at the 2015 World Championships in Beijing without advancing from the first round.

His personal best in the event is 45.42 seconds set in Potchefstroom in 2015.

International competitions

1Disqualified in the final

References

South African male sprinters
Living people
People from Graaff-Reinet
1995 births
World Athletics Championships athletes for South Africa
Sportspeople from the Eastern Cape
20th-century South African people
21st-century South African people